Jonathan Moreira (born 22 August 1996) is an Argentine professional footballer who plays as a midfielder for Rivadavia.

Career
Moreira progressed through the ranks of Deportivo Español. He was promoted into senior football in November 2018 by manager Pedro Catalano, subsequently appearing for his professional debut on 19 November during a 2–2 draw with Defensores Unidos in Primera B Metropolitana; replacing Cristian Vázquez after sixty-nine minutes. In January 2020, Moreira joined Torneo Regional Federal Amateur outfit Rivadavia.

Career statistics
.

References

External links

1996 births
Living people
Place of birth missing (living people)
Argentine footballers
Association football midfielders
Primera B Metropolitana players
Deportivo Español footballers
Rivadavia de Lincoln footballers